Muna Obiekwe (born 1979) was a Nigerian actor. He was one of the most popular actors in Nigeria. On January 18, 2015, Obiekwe died from kidney disease. He was also the first cousin to Nigerian actor Yul Edochie.

Filmography

References

2015 deaths
Nigerian male film actors
21st-century Nigerian male actors
Deaths from kidney disease
1979 births
20th-century births
Nigerian male television actors
Igbo actors